Kenneth Erik Contreras is an American film actor.

Personal life
Contreras was born in El Paso, Texas. Contreras is married to actress Sam Doumit; they were married on September 3, 2005 and they have one son and one daughter.

Career
Contreras first appeared in the film Losing Faith in (2009). He starred in the title role of the short film Fallen Angel in 2010.  Contreras had a minor role as a Resistance Agent in the film The Vanquisher in 2010, which was not released until 2016.

Filmography

References

External links
 
 Erik Contreras Official Website

Living people
Year of birth missing (living people)
American male film actors
Male actors from El Paso, Texas